Wittlich-Land is a Verbandsgemeinde ("collective municipality") in the district Bernkastel-Wittlich, in Rhineland-Palatinate, Germany. It is located around the town Wittlich, which is the seat of Wittlich-Land, but not part of the Verbandsgemeinde.  On 1 July 2014 it was expanded with the municipalities of the former Verbandsgemeinde Manderscheid.

Wittlich-Land consists of the following Ortsgemeinden ("local municipalities"):

 Altrich
 Arenrath
 Bergweiler
 Bettenfeld
 Binsfeld
 Bruch
 Dierfeld
 Dierscheid
 Dodenburg
 Dreis
 Eckfeld
 Eisenschmitt
 Esch
 Gipperath
 Gladbach
 Greimerath
 Großlittgen
 Hasborn
 Heckenmünster
 Heidweiler
 Hetzerath
 Hupperath
 Karl
 Klausen
 Landscheid
 Laufeld
 Manderscheid
 Meerfeld
 Minderlittgen
 Musweiler
 Niederöfflingen
 Niederscheidweiler
 Niersbach
 Oberöfflingen
 Oberscheidweiler
 Osann-Monzel
 Pantenburg
 Platten
 Plein
 Rivenich
 Salmtal
 Schladt
 Schwarzenborn
 Sehlem
 Wallscheid

 

Verbandsgemeinde in Rhineland-Palatinate